The Hudson River Valley Greenway is a system of parks, trails, kayak/canoe routes, etc. along New York's Hudson River, and the organization that serves to promote and preserve them. The Greenway system includes the Hudson Valley Rail Trail. Fourteen counties are in the Greenway area. Dutchess County, Putnam County, and Westchester County are in the Hudson River Valley Greenway Compact Area.

References

External links 
 Map of Greenway Area

Hudson Valley
Physiographic sections
Upstate New York
Parks on the Hudson River